Justice Lamar may refer to:

Lucius Quintus Cincinnatus Lamar, associate justice of the United States Supreme Court
Joseph Rucker Lamar, associate justice of the United States Supreme Court
Henry Graybill Lamar, associate justice of the Supreme Court of Georgia
Ann Hannaford Lamar, associate justice of the Supreme Court of Mississippi